The California 500 was a CART race held at Ontario Motor Speedway in Ontario, California. The event represented a continuous lineage of open wheel oval racing in the Southern California-area that dates back to 1970.

History
Open wheel oval racing in southern California dated back to the USAC California 500 at Ontario Motor Speedway in Ontario, California, held from 1970 to 1978. The race was part of IndyCar racing's "triple crown", and at its inception, was held in high prestige. The inaugural running was considered a huge success, with 187,000 in attendance. However, it became a CART event in 1979 and the track fell into financial troubles in 1980 and closed at the end of 1980. Subsequent running's were never able to match the success of the 1970 event.

Indy car races were also held at nearby Riverside, but only from 1967–1969 (prior to the opening of Ontario) in 1970 and again from 1981–1983 (after Ontario closed in 1980).

Race results

References

External links
Champ Car Stats: Ontario archive, Fontana archive
Ultimate Racing History: Ontario archive, 

Champ Car races
Recurring sporting events established in 1970
Recurring sporting events disestablished in 1980